Silene laevigata, the Troödos catchfly, is glaucous, erect or decumbent annual plant. It flowers in March–June.

Habitat
Pine forest, roadsides and garrigue on dry igneous mountainsides at  altitude.

Distribution
Endemic to Cyprus, locally common on the Troödos range.

References

  Flora of Cyprus Volume 1, Robert Desmond Meikle, Bentham-Moxon Trust, The Herbarium Royal Botanic Gardens, Kew, 1977,

External links

laevigata
Endemic flora of Cyprus